Sogatella molina is a species of delphacid planthopper in the family Delphacidae. It is found in the Caribbean, Central America, and North America.

References

Articles created by Qbugbot
Insects described in 1963
Delphacini